Clevedon, previously known as Wairoa South, is a rural town in Auckland, New Zealand, located in the Franklin ward, one of the thirteen administrative divisions of Auckland city. The town is governed by the Auckland Council. The town is the centre of an administrative ward of Franklin which takes in much of the largely rural area to the east of the urban heart of the city.

Clevedon is located on the Wairoa River five kilometres from its estuary and outflow into the Tamaki Strait, an arm of the Hauraki Gulf. It is 14 kilometres from the centre of the suburb of Manukau, which lies to the northwest. To the south of Clevedon rise the rugged hills of the Hunua Ranges. Several popular beaches are located on the coast close to Clevedon, including Duder's Beach and Kawakawa Bay.  Between these two beaches lies the Duder Regional Park.

History and culture

Pre-European history

Prior to human settlement, the area was swampy, and Bush moa, Mantell's moa and North Island giant moa bones have been found in the vicinity. Clevedon and surrounding area is traditionally the territory of the Ngāi Tai or Ngāi Tai ki Tāmaki people, who are descendants of the Tainui waka. In the 1300s, crew from the Tainui waka took shelter at Whakakaiwhara Peninsula.  When they went ashore, they feasted on the fruit of the kiekie vine, giving the origin of the name, to eat (kai) the edible bracts (whara) of the kiekie vine.   The peninsula and headland Pā providing shelter to the Tainui waka became the permanent home and Pā for many Ngai Tai .  The area was named Te Wairoa (the Long River).   Ngāi Tai traversed their tribal domain, including the inner islands of the Hauraki Gulf, in a seasonal cycle of harvesting, gathering and fishing.  The peninsula is now managed by the Auckland Council as part of the Duder Regional Park. 

Ngā Tai maintained settlements in several places, including:
 Otau and Tuawa near present-day Clevedon, in Te Wairoa River valley
 At Tararua near the mouth of the Rautawhiti Stream, in Te Wairoa River valley
 At Takatekauere, Te Totara, Te Ruato and Pehuwai on the western side of Te Wairoa River
 Te Oue, Mawherawhera, Te Kuiti and Umupuia, on the Whakakaiwhara Peninsula

Between the 1830s and 1863, the Te Hingawaka hapū of Ngāti Pāoa lived at the base of Te Oue pā.

In 1982,  Rachael Beamish gave a portion of her beachfront land and began fundraising for a marae.

European settlement

The European settlement of Clevedon was established in 1866. It was named after the English town of Clevedon.

All Souls Church, built in the Selwyn style and located in Clevedon, is registered by Heritage New Zealand as a Category II structure, with registration number 682.

Marae

The local Umupuia Marae and Ngeungeu meeting house is a traditional meeting place for Ngāi Tai ki Tāmaki and the Waikato Tainui hapū of Ngāti Koheriki and Ngāi Tai.

Demographics
Clevedon settlement is part of the larger Clevedon statistical area.

Clevedon settlement had a population of 606 at the 2018 New Zealand census, an increase of 51 people (9.2%) since the 2013 census, and an increase of 45 people (8.0%) since the 2006 census. There were 189 households, comprising 297 males and 312 females, giving a sex ratio of 0.95 males per female, with 123 people (20.3%) aged under 15 years, 105 (17.3%) aged 15 to 29, 288 (47.5%) aged 30 to 64, and 93 (15.3%) aged 65 or older.

Ethnicities were 91.1% European/Pākehā, 5.9% Māori, 3.0% Pacific peoples, 6.9% Asian, and 2.5% other ethnicities. People may identify with more than one ethnicity.

Although some people chose not to answer the census's question about religious affiliation, 43.1% had no religion, 44.6% were Christian, 1.0% had Māori religious beliefs, 2.5% were Hindu, 2.5% were Buddhist and 1.5% had other religions.

Of those at least 15 years old, 138 (28.6%) people had a bachelor's or higher degree, and 60 (12.4%) people had no formal qualifications. 138 people (28.6%) earned over $70,000 compared to 17.2% nationally. The employment status of those at least 15 was that 279 (57.8%) people were employed full-time, 84 (17.4%) were part-time, and 6 (1.2%) were unemployed.

Clevedon statistical area

The statistical area had a population of 1,515 at the 2018 New Zealand census, an increase of 63 people (4.3%) since the 2013 census, and an increase of 171 people (12.7%) since the 2006 census. There were 507 households, comprising 762 males and 753 females, giving a sex ratio of 1.01 males per female. The median age was 43.0 years (compared with 37.4 years nationally), with 294 people (19.4%) aged under 15 years, 261 (17.2%) aged 15 to 29, 756 (49.9%) aged 30 to 64, and 207 (13.7%) aged 65 or older.

Ethnicities were 92.5% European/Pākehā, 7.1% Māori, 1.8% Pacific peoples, 5.0% Asian, and 1.8% other ethnicities. People may identify with more than one ethnicity.

The percentage of people born overseas was 21.0, compared with 27.1% nationally.

Although some people chose not to answer the census's question about religious affiliation, 49.5% had no religion, 41.2% were Christian, 0.4% had Māori religious beliefs, 1.2% were Hindu, 0.2% were Muslim, 1.2% were Buddhist and 1.4% had other religions.

Of those at least 15 years old, 351 (28.7%) people had a bachelor's or higher degree, and 144 (11.8%) people had no formal qualifications. The median income was $44,200, compared with $31,800 nationally. 375 people (30.7%) earned over $70,000 compared to 17.2% nationally. The employment status of those at least 15 was that 690 (56.5%) people were employed full-time, 234 (19.2%) were part-time, and 27 (2.2%) were unemployed.

Education
In 1895 it became Clevedon School.

Notable people

 Phil Goff, politician and Auckland mayor

References

.

External links

Clevedon town website
Local businesses

Populated places in the Auckland Region